The Kishanpur Wildlife Sanctuary is a part of the Dudhwa Tiger Reserve near Mailani in Uttar Pradesh, India. It is 13 km away from Bhira town in Lakhimpur Kheri District. The sanctuary is covered with a dense deciduous forest of sal, teak and jamun.

Fauna
 Tiger
 Leopard
 Swamp deer
 Hog deer
 Barking deer
 Bengal florican
 Lesser florican

See also 
 Dudhwa National Park
 Katarniaghat Wildlife Sanctuary
 Dudhwa Tiger Reserve

References

External links 
 "Kishanpur Wildlife Sanctuary"

Wildlife sanctuaries in Uttar Pradesh
Tourist attractions in Lakhimpur Kheri district
Protected areas established in 1972
1972 establishments in Uttar Pradesh